Brittany Gray (born December 17, 1985) is a Canadian actress, singer and dancer who found fame in her teenage years after her roles in the film Chicago and the musical The Producers. Brittany was born and raised in Pickering, Ontario, where she began studying dance at the age of 3 and soon after began singing, acting and modeling.

After landing a role in Disney's Aaron Stone, Gray's career progressed into the television industry, with appearances in other Disney projects like Once Upon A Mattress with Carol Burnett. She also had a role in the musical The Toxic Avenger (musical) for which she received positive reviews. Brittany was also on Season 2 of Dan for Mayor as "Melanie" and the new CBC series InSecurity as "Amber".

Gray is also a certified Makeup Artist who runs her own company, Fancy Face Make-up Artistry & Co., a "beauty boutique" in 2006. Her company grew quickly due to her local celebrity clientele and her work as a makeup artist on popular shows like So You Think You Can Dance Canada.

Career 

Gray has had roles in several notable films and stage musicals, including Chicago, the Tony Award-winning musical The Producers, the Queen musical We Will Rock You, and the film Amelia, starring Hilary Swank and Richard Gere. She has appeared in numerous Disney projects starting off as Megan Fox's dance double in Confessions of a Teenage Drama Queen and was later a part of the ensemble cast of Eloise at the Plaza starring Julie Andrews.  Gray eventually landed a lead guest role in the Disney television series Aaron Stone playing "Hive", and a role as lead dancer and singer in the movie version of Once Upon a Mattress with Carol Burnett.

Gray has also appeared on Canadian television and the Canadian stage: she was Howie Mandel's Case Model #5 in Deal or No Deal Canada, and starred as "Sarah" in The Toxic Avenger at The Danforth Music Hall in which she played a sassy, blind librarian and love interest to "Toxie".

Gray appeared in Season 2 of Dan for Mayor and in the CBC series InSecurity.

Entrepreneurship 
Throughout her acting and dance career, Brittany has sat in the chairs of many makeup artists which led to her interest in the profession and decision to become a certified makeup artist. In 2006, Brittany founded her own company, Fancy Face Make-up Artistry & Co., a beauty and fashion boutique mainly servicing TV shows, music videos and fashion shoots. She is an official makeup artist for So You Think You Can Dance Canada and the official spokesperson for BellaPierre Cosmetics on The Shopping Channel.

References 

 The New York Times Movies
 http://bernews.com/bermuda-profiles/daren-a-herbert/
 https://web.archive.org/web/20120327020643/http://uk.movies.yahoo.com/c/Chicago/cast-credits-102837.html
 https://web.archive.org/web/20161002034736/http://brittanygray.com/
 https://www.imdb.com/title/tt1609540/fullcredits
 
 http://www.newsdurhamregion.com/articlePrint/137709
 https://www.thestar.com/living/shopping/article/736245--at-this-place-it-s-80s-all-the-way
 http://www.postcity.com/Post-City-Magazines/December-2009/Stellar-talent-on-display-in-rude-and-crude-show/
 http://toronto.broadwayworld.com/article/BWW_Interview_The_Toxic_Avengers_Brittany_Gray_Talks_Lloyd_Kaufman_and_Slime_20091120
 https://www.theglobeandmail.com/globe-drive/car-life/my-car/ford-focus-was-perfect-when-she-was-sixteen/article1343138/ 
 http://www.complectionsmake-up.com/blog/index.shtml?pg=18
 
 https://web.archive.org/web/20121110154652/http://www.canada.com/cityguides/toronto/story.html?id=e4a21463-74db-48f3-9785-ce799a5570d9
 http://durhamregion.com/article/49452
 http://www.cp24.com/servlet/an/local/CTVNews/20091208/091208_toxic_avenger/20091208/?hub=CP24Entertainment

External links 
 http://www.brittanygray.com
 http://www.fancyface.ca
 https://www.imdb.com/name/nm1695972/

Canadian television actresses
Canadian film actresses
People from Pickering, Ontario
Living people
1985 births